Dropzone is a horizontally scrolling shooter developed by Archer Maclean (under the name Arena Graphics) for the Atari 8-bit family and published in 1984 by U.S. Gold. It was ported to the Commodore 64, and later released for the Nintendo Entertainment System, Game Boy, Game Gear, and Game Boy Color.

Maclean's first commercial game, Dropzone is similar in gameplay and style to the arcade game Defender and borrows many elements, including the same style of font, aliens, and title screen.

Plot
On the surface of Jupiter's moon, Io, a human scientific research base is under attack by aliens. The player dons a jetpack armed with a laser, a cloaking device and three smart bombs, to rescue the scientists and return them to the base.

Gameplay

The gameplay is in the style of Williams Electronics' Defender, with some influences from Scramble and Robotron: 2084. Players control the hero trying to rescue the scientists on a horizontally-scrolling game field. Players must elude or engage various aliens—some slow, others faster—and return the scientists to the base's eponymous dropzone. The aliens capture scientists walking along the ground. The player must shoot the enemy aliens and catch the falling scientists. Sometimes the aliens will carry lethal androids instead, which must be avoided.

There are 99 levels of gameplay, each increasingly difficult. After level 99, the levels repeat starting level 95.

Development
Maclean purchased an Atari 800 as soon as they were officially launched in the UK in 1981 and started writing what would eventually evolve into Dropzone. Maclean converted the game to the Commodore 64 himself:

The name Dropzone was not settled on until shortly before the game went gold.

Maclean entered into a publishing deal with U.S. Gold for the European distribution of the game. After 18 months, however, they stopped paying him royalties claiming that the game was no longer selling. In addition, Maclean saw it for sale in areas outside of Europe and even in the United States. Four years of legal wrangling with the publisher followed, until they finally settled out of court for copyright infringement. With the proceeds from the settlement, Maclean bought his first Ferrari.

Reception
The Atari 8-bit version received overwhelmingly good reviews. A reviewer for Computer and Video Games in a May 1985 review stated that Dropzone was one of the best Atari games and Atari owners could not afford to miss this game. Personal Computer World reviewer agreed with this notion: "Although Dropzone is virtually a rewrite of Defender, the quality of its graphics and sound make it far superior."

The Commodore 64 version of the game was awarded a Gold Medal in issue 3 of Zzap!64 magazine, with an overall rating of 95%.

Legacy
The sequel, Super Dropzone, added new weapon types and end-level bosses. It is available for the Super Nintendo Entertainment System (titled Super Dropzone on all packaging, but only Dropzone on the title screen), Game Boy Advance and PlayStation. Only the Game Boy Advance version saw a North American release; the others were European exclusives.

A fully-playable port of the C64 version can be found in the PC version of Jimmy White's 2: Cueball, also by Archer Maclean.

References

1984 video games
Acclaim Entertainment games
Action video games
Action-adventure games
Atari 8-bit family games
Commodore 64 games
Fiction set on Io (moon)
Game Boy Color games
Game Boy games
Horizontally scrolling shooters
Nintendo Entertainment System games
Game Gear games
Single-player video games
Video game clones
U.S. Gold games
Mindscape games
Video games developed in the United Kingdom